Agilulf ( 555–616) was a king of the Lombards. In Italian he is known as Agilulfo.

Agilulf may also refer to:

Agilulf (bishop of Metz) (c. 537–601), Frankish bishop
Agilulf (Suebi) (420 – after 482), Suebian ruler

See also
Agilulfo, the protagonist of Italo Calvino's novel The Nonexistent Knight